Kim E. Nielsen is an American historian and author who specializes in disability studies. Since 2012, Nielsen has been a professor of history, disability studies, and women's studies at the University of Toledo. Nielsen originally trained as historian of women and politics, and came to disability history and studies via her discovery of Helen Keller's political life.

Early life and education
Nielsen grew up largely in Northern Minnesota. She earned a BA from Macalester College in 1988, and from the University of Iowa an MA in 1991 and a PhD in 1996. At Macalester she was mentored by Peter Rachleff, and her thesis advisor at Iowa was Linda Kerber.

Career
For fourteen years, until 2012, she was a professor of Democracy and Justice Studies at the University of Wisconsin–Green Bay. Nielsen has written biographies of Helen Keller and Anne Sullivan Macy, and participated as an on-screen expert in the American Masters episode, "Becoming Helen Keller" (2021).

She was the founding president of the Disability History Association, and her book A Disability History of the United States (2012) was described as "the first broad survey of its topic and the first work to lay out a complete periodization of American disability history".

Filmmaker John Gianvito called The Radical Lives of Helen Keller "the best of the biographies" in a 2020 interview. A 2021 essay in The New York Times calls The Radical Lives of Helen Keller "a revelation". In "Disability History, Power, and Rethinking the Idea of 'The Other (2005), historian Catherine Kudlick notes that "Unlike earlier biographers, Nielsen places Keller's life in the context of major trends in American history ... to understand her and her disability as rich and complex rather than as a feel-good caricature of one inspirational person."

Awards and honors
Nielsen has received honors from the Organization of American Historians (OAH) and the Southern Association for Women Historians (SAWH). The SAWH awarded her the 2007 Elizabeth Taylor Prize for the best article in southern women's history. In 1998, she was a Fulbright Scholar in Iceland, and in 2005 held an OAH Lectureship in Japan.

She is the winner of the 2021 Rosen Prize of the American Association for the History of Medicine for The Oxford Handbook of Disability History, co-edited with Michael Rembis and Catherine J. Kudlick. The book also won the 2019 Disability History Association Book Award.

Published works
 
 
 
 
 
 
 

With Michael Rembis, Nielsen co-edits Disability Histories, a book series published by the University of Illinois Press.  The series explores the lived experiences of individuals and groups from a broad range of societies, cultures, time periods, and geographic locations, who either identified as disabled or were considered by the dominant culture to be disabled.

From 2015 to 2018 she coedited the Disability Studies Quarterly with Allyson Day.

Further reading

References

External links 
 Kim Nielsen, "Disability History, Disability Justice, and Future Directions" (November 7, 2019), a presentation given at the Wyoming Institute for Disabilities (WIND)
 Science History Institute, "Bonus Episode: Interview with Kim Nielsen" Distillations (August 13, 2020). A podcast interview conducted by Rigoberto Hernandez, available in audio and transcript.
 Kim Nielsen, Rabia Belt, and Beth Linker, "Disability and the American Past: An Introduction to Disability History" (October 7, 2021), a webinar sponsored by the Massachusetts Historical Society

University of Toledo faculty
Disability studies academics
Living people
Year of birth missing (living people)
Place of birth missing (living people)